Mugberia Assembly constituency  was an assembly constituency in Purba Medinipur district in the Indian state of West Bengal.

Overview
As a consequence of the orders of the Delimitation Commission, Mugberia Assembly constituency ceases to exist from 2011.

It was part of Kanthi (Lok Sabha constituency).

Results

1977-2006
Kiranmay Nanda of West Bengal Socialist Party (at times shown in election records as Independent or as a CPI(M), he was a Janata Party candidate in 1977.) won the 214 Mugberia assembly seat seven times in a row, defeating Kajal Barman of Trinamool Congress in 2006, Suvendu Adhikari of Trinamool Congress in 2001, Narayan Mukherjee of Congress in 1996, Animesh Dayen of Congress in 1991, Krishna Chaitanyamay Nanda of Congress in 1987, Prasanta Sahoo of Congress in 1982 and Amarendra Krishna Goswami of CPI(M).

1967-1972
Prasanta Kumar Sahoo of Congress won in 1972. Amarendra Krishna Goswami of CPI(M) won in 1971, Biswabrata Roy Chaudhury of Bangla Congress won in 1969. B. Maity of Bangla Congress won the Mugberia seat in 1967.

References

Former assembly constituencies of West Bengal
Politics of Purba Medinipur district